Rajdhani is a 1956 Indian action film directed by Naresh Saigal. Talat Mahmood and Lata Mangeshkar were playback singers for the film.

Cast
Sunil Dutt 		
Nimmi 			
Durga Khote 		
Johnny Walker	
Ramayan Tiwari 		
Purnima 		
Kumari Naaz

Music
"Bhul Ja Sapne Suhane Bhul Ja" - Talat Mahmood, Lata Mangeshkar
"Pehli Mulakat Me Diwana Dil" - Lata Mangeshkar
"Chhut Jaaen, Chhut Gayaa" - Lata Mangeshkar
"De De Mora Kangna Tu" - Lata Mangeshkar
"Din Khushiyo Ke Loot Gaye" - Lata Mangeshkar
"Haathon Men, Aa Jaa" - Lata Mangeshkar
"Mai To Chanda Se Gori" - Lata Mangeshkar

Reception
The film has been described as "forgettable".

References

External links 
 

1956 films
1950s Hindi-language films
Indian action drama films
1950s action films
Films scored by Hansraj Behl
Hindi-language action films
Indian black-and-white films